The Sorrows of the Girl Mayyasa or Ahzan al-bint Mayyasa is a Yemeni short story collection by Zayd Mutee' Dammaj. It was first published in 1990.

References

Books by Zayd Mutee' Dammaj
1990 short story collections